Alderman Canal East is a 1.6 hectare Local Nature Reserve in Ipswich in Suffolk. It is owned by Ipswich Borough Council and managed by the Greenways Countryside Project.

A path runs along a canalised part of the River Gipping, and the site also has reedbeds, a ditch and grassland with tall herbs. There are uncommon wetland flora, and birds include spotted flycatchers, common kingfishers and reed buntings.

There is access from Alderman Road.

See also
 Alderman Canal West

References

Local Nature Reserves in Suffolk
Canals in Suffolk
Ipswich